Battle of Port-au-Prince may refer to:

 Battle of Port-au-Prince (1919)
 Battle of Port-au-Prince (1920)